The 2012–13 División de Honor is the 46th season of the top flight of the Spanish domestic rugby union competition since its inception in 1953. Regular season began in September 2012 and finished on April 28, 2013.

The playoffs began on 19 May and the Final took place on 2 June.

Defending champions, Valladolid, successfully defended its previous season title after defeating Santboiana 27–25 in the championship final. La Vila was the relegated team to División de Honor B.

Competition format
The regular season runs through 18 matchdays. Upon completion the regular season, it is the turn of championship playoffs. The breakdown is as follows;
Teams in 1st & 2nd at regular season standings receive a bye to semifinal.
Teams at 3rd, 4th, 5th & 6th position plays for the two vacant places in quarter-finals.
Team in 11th position plays the relegation playoff.
Team in 12th position is relegated.

Each win means 4 points to winning team.
A draw means 2 points for each team.
1 bonus point for a team that achieves 4 tries in a match.
A defeat by 7 or less points means 1 bonus point for defeated team.

Teams

Regular season standings

Source: Federación Española de Rugby

Championship playoffs

Bracket

Quarter-finals

Semifinals

Final

Relegation playoff
The relegation playoff was contested over two legs by Hernani, who finished 11th in División de Honor, and neighbours Alcobendas, the losing team from División de Honor B promotion playoff final. Vigo won the tie, winning 36-25 on aggregate.

1st leg

2nd leg

 Hernani remained in División de Honor. Sanitas Alcobendas remained in División de Honor B.

See also
2012–13 División de Honor B de Rugby

References

External links
Official site

2012-13
 
Spain